Stevie Jerrell Johnson (born February 24, 1978) is an American former professional basketball player.

College
Johnson played basketball with Iowa State from 1996 to 2000. In 1999-2000 season the team won the Big 12 regular season and tournament titles and went onto the Elite Eight. When his basketball eligibility was up after the 1999-2000 season, he stayed on for one season and tried out for the football team. Johnson hadn't played organized football since his freshman year of high school but made the team, and was a significant contributor at linebacker Iowa State squad which won a school-record nine games and captured the school's first bowl victory

Professional career
Johnson joined Úrvalsdeild club Þór Akureyri inn 2001 and went on to lead the league in scoring while being second in rebounding. In August 2002, Johnson signed with Úrvalsdeild club Haukar. Before the season the club had lost many of its key players and was predicted an 8th-place finish in the league. However, Johnson's stellar play propelled the club to finish with the third best regular season record, earning him the nickname "Stevie Wonder" in the Icelandic press. He once again led the league in scoring, while finishing third in rebounding, and was named the Úrvalsdeild Foreign Player of the year. Johnson was selected to the 2003 Icelandic All-Star game where he scored 39 points and was named the All-Star game MVP, while also winning the dunk contest.

Johnson spent the next eight years in Spain, followed by a stint in Argentina and finished his career with Crailsheim Merlins in Germany's Basketball Bundesliga.

References

External links
College stats
Profile at KKI.is
Eurobasket.com Profile

1978 births
Living people
American expatriate basketball people in Argentina
American expatriate basketball people in Germany
American expatriate basketball people in Iceland
American expatriate basketball people in Spain
American men's basketball players
Crailsheim Merlins players
Iowa State Cyclones football players
Iowa State Cyclones men's basketball players
Úrvalsdeild karla (basketball) players
Haukar men's basketball players
Þór Akureyri men's basketball players
Centers (basketball)
Power forwards (basketball)